Zhang Yonghai (born March 15, 1979, in Panjin) is a former Chinese football player who played as a defender.

Club career
Zhang Yonghai started his football career with Liaoning F.C. youth team where he eventually graduated to the senior Liaoning team in 2001. After several seasons with Liaoning FC where he would establish himself as a regular within the team he would join reigning league champions Shenzhen Jianlibao in the 2005 league season for a season long loan period. He returned to Liaoning for another season until the beginning of 2007 league season saw him transfer to Beijing Guoan for 4,000,000 RMB. He would gradually establish himself as a regular in defence and by the 2008 league season he would be named as vice-captain. In the 2009 league season he would go on to aid Beijing to win the 2009 Chinese Super League title.
On 28 February 2014, Zhang transferred to Chinese Super League side Liaoning Whowin.

On 18 July 2014, Zhang transferred to China League One side Chengdu Tiancheng.

International career
Zhang Yonghai would begin his international career on March 26, 2005, when he played in a friendly against Spain in a 3-0 defeat. Under the Chinese Head coach Zhu Guanghu he would play in several more friendlies and play in the 2005 East Asian Cup where he would score his first goal. He would, however, be dropped soon afterwards until the next Chinese head coach Vladimir Petrović would include him in several further friendlies but would once again drop him soon afterwards.

Career statistics

Club statistics

International goals

Honours
Beijing Guoan
Chinese Super League: 2009

References

External links
Player profile at 163.com
Player profile at Sina.com

Player stats at Sohu.com

1979 births
Living people
People from Panjin
Chinese footballers
Footballers from Liaoning
China international footballers
Liaoning F.C. players
Shenzhen F.C. players
Beijing Guoan F.C. players
Shanghai Shenxin F.C. players
Chengdu Tiancheng F.C. players
Chinese Super League players
China League One players
Association football defenders